The Nightfly is the debut solo studio album by American singer-songwriter Donald Fagen. Produced by Gary Katz, it was released October 1, 1982, by Warner Bros. Records. Fagen was previously best known for his work in the group Steely Dan, with whom he enjoyed a successful career since the 1970s. The band separated in 1981, leading Fagen to pursue a solo career. Although The Nightfly includes a number of production staff and musicians who had played on Steely Dan records, it was Fagen's first release without longtime collaborator Walter Becker.

Unlike most of Fagen's previous work, The Nightfly is almost blatantly autobiographical. Many of the songs relate to the cautiously optimistic mood of his suburban childhood in the late 1950s and early 1960s and incorporate such topics as late-night jazz disc jockeys, fallout shelters, and tropical vacations. Recorded over eight months at various studios between New York City and Los Angeles, the album is an early example of a fully digital recording in popular music. The nascent technology, as well as the perfectionist nature of its engineers and musicians, made the album difficult to record.

The Nightfly was well-received, both critically and commercially. It was certified platinum in both the US and UK and generated two popular singles with the top 40 hit "I.G.Y." and the MTV favorite "New Frontier". Among critics, The Nightfly gained widespread acclaim and received seven nominations at the 1983 Grammy Awards. The relatively low-key but long-lived popularity of The Nightfly led Robert J. Toth of The Wall Street Journal in 2008 to dub the album "one of pop music's sneakiest masterpieces."

Background 
Donald Fagen, born in Passaic, New Jersey, in 1948, grew up with an affinity for music. As a kid, he enjoyed listening to rock and roll pioneers Chuck Berry and Fats Domino, but personally felt that, as rock music gained popularity, it lost an edge. Fagen, a "lonely" kid, then turned to late-night jazz radio shows for the vitality he felt the new music lacked. As he got older, he intended to go to graduate school and pursue literature. Instead, he was "swept up" into the counterculture at Bard College, where he met Walter Becker. They later moved to Los Angeles at the suggestion of their friend Gary Katz and took jobs as staff writers for ABC Records. Together, they formed Steely Dan, releasing their first album, Can't Buy a Thrill, in 1972. Over the course of the decade, the group became enormously successful on the strength of the albums Countdown to Ecstasy (1973), Pretzel Logic (1974), Katy Lied (1975), The Royal Scam (1976), and Aja (1977), the band's best-selling effort and a critical favorite. They gradually shifted from performing live to working solely in the studio, making the project a revolving selection of session musicians at the behest of Fagen and Becker.

Their relationship became strained during the making of 1980's Gaucho, largely due to their insistence for perfection. Both Becker and Fagen would later recall they seemed depressed. In addition, Becker was in the midst of a drug problem and went through a withdrawal stage. Though Fagen imagined they might "stick it out for a while," he admitted to Robert Palmer of The New York Times, in an article published on June 17, 1981, that the group had indeed separated. "Basically, we decided after writing and playing together for 14 years, we could use a changement d'air as the French say," he told Palmer. After their split, Fagen worked on a song for the soundtrack of the film Heavy Metal, which got him back into the studio. He began working towards a solo album shortly thereafter. "Working on it has been interesting. The fact that it's not a Steely Dan album has freed me from a certain image, a preconceived idea of how it'll sound," he said at the time. Fagen had hoped to record music on his own "a year or so" prior to the duo's breakup. The album was originally slated to be titled Talk Radio.

Recording and production 
To prepare to use the digital technology, the album's engineers took classes at 3M in St. Paul, Minnesota.
The Nightfly was recorded in 1981–82 at Soundworks Digital Audio/Video Recording Studios and Automated Sound in New York City, and at Village Recorders in Los Angeles. The producer was Gary Katz, the album engineer was Roger Nichols and the mixer was Elliot Scheiner; all had worked on most of the  seven previous Steely Dan albums. Many of the musicians had also played on Steely Dan records, including Jeff Porcaro, Rick Derringer and Larry Carlton. Similar to the Aja and Gaucho albums, a large number of studio musicians were employed, with the liner notes crediting a total 31 musicians. During a radio interview on Off the Record in 1983, Fagen revealed that, though he had considered song writing one of his strengths, and that initially the album's songs came to him easily, he began to struggle without his long-term co-writer Walter Becker. This writing difficulty turned into a lengthy writer's block after the album was finished. His demos for the album were mostly composed on keyboards and a drum machine and remained without lyrics, to allow for alteration when in the studio.

The Nightfly is one of the earliest examples of fully digital recording in popular music. Katz and Fagen had previously experimented with digital recording for Gaucho, which ended up entirely analog. Nichols conducted experiments and found that the digital recordings sounded better than those recorded to magnetic tape. The Nightfly was recorded using 3M's 32-track and four-track recorders. Nichols built a new drum machine, the Wendel II—a sequel to the original Wendel, which was employed for their work on Gaucho. The new model was upgraded from 8 bits to 16 bits and "plugged straight into the 3M digital machines, so there was no degradation" in sound. Problems with the technology persisted in the beginning, particularly regarding the alignment of the 3M machines. Representatives from 3M had to be called to align the machines, but eventually Fagen and Nichols grew tired of this. Nichols and engineers Jerry Garsszva and Wayne Yurgelun took classes at 3M's Minnesota headquarters and returned knowing how to align the machines themselves. "I was ready to transfer to analog and give it up on several occasions, but my engineering staff kept talking me into it," Fagen remembered. They practiced an early form of "comping" Fagen's vocals—which they called "beat[ing] the computer"—wherein he would record multiple takes and the engineers would pick the best lines from each take. On "Walk Between Raindrops", they combined bass parts playing on a keyboard bass and bass guitar. Doubling bass lines would "become common practice on many records," according to writer James Sweet.

Though previous Steely Dan projects were often recorded live, Fagen opted to overdub each part separately for The Nightfly. It became enormously difficult, between this approach and the new technology, to record the album. Pianist Michael Omartian "objected strongly" when Fagen tasked him to "set the groove" of the title track on his own, with nothing but a click track. On another occasion, Fagen "demanded subtle timing differences between the left and right-hand piano parts" on "Ruby Baby". The effect he desired was achieved with Omartian and Greg Phillinganes playing together on the same keyboard. For the "party noises" in "Ruby Baby", the team suspended a microphone from the ceiling of Studio 54 – just next door to the studio they were working in – and recorded one of Jerry Rubin's "business parties". Unsatisfied with the results, the group instead held a party in the studio by themselves and included that ambience in the song.

Larry Carlton performs lead guitar on much of the album and recorded his pieces in four days. During his time with the group, he discovered a humming sound coming from his amplifier. The engineers discovered the source on the outside of the building: a large magnet "that formed part of the New York subway system." In one instance, a strange smell permeated the studio space at Soundworks. The studio staff "gutted" the studio, removing its air conditioning, carpeting, and recording console until they discovered the cause of the smell: a deceased rat in a drainpipe. Sessions regularly stretched long into the evening; Fagen would often refer to this as "being on the night train." In the end, the album took eight months to record and was mixed in 10 days.

Composition 

The Nightfly is considered more jazzy than Fagen's previous work with Steely Dan, and his lyrics are more wistful and nostalgic than biting. Fagen aimed for his lyrics to have "as little irony as possible”, and his goal was to make an album that was fun to listen to. As many of the songs come from an adolescent viewpoint, he hoped for them to maintain "a certain innocence”. Walter Becker was responsible for the more sardonic elements in Steely Dan, and many writers have considered his absence the reason for the album's "warm and nostalgic" tone. Another difference between The Nightfly and his work with Becker is that it maintains a focus on a "certain period [or] motif”, according to Fagen. Though Fagen hints in the album's liner notes that it is an autobiographical piece, he downplayed this notion in a later interview: "It is not me exactly. It is a composite character of myself, what I remember and people I knew. Plus, it includes my feelings in retrospect”.

According to Sam Sutherland, writing for Billboard, Fagen's songs "shimmer with jazz harmonies and alternately swing, shuffle or bounce to a samba“. Will Fulford-Jones, in his appraisal of the album in 1001 Albums You Must Hear Before You Die, considered it ironic in the sense that while it focuses on a simpler time, its production sounded like a modern Steely Dan album. Fagen held a "propensity for the perfect drum track”, and multiple drummers are credited on the album, sometimes on the same song. For example, James Gadson and Jeff Porcaro are present on "I.G.Y.", with the former playing the snare drum, kick drum, and hi-hat, and the latter performing the tom-tom fills. Even still, some songs contain the drum machine Wendel II. Fagen feared listeners finding plagiarism in his lyrics, so he altered a lyric in "The Goodbye Look"—"Behind the big casinos by the beach"—as it "reminded him of a line from a well-known poem." He was also concerned the "late line" lyrics in the title song were too close to the late-night news program Nightline.

Songs 

The album opens with "I.G.Y.", the title of which refers to the "International Geophysical Year", an event that ran from July 1957 to December 1958. The I.G.Y. was an international scientific project promoting collaboration among the world's scientists. Fagen's lyrics reference, from the point of view of that time, an optimistic vision of futuristic concepts such as solar-powered cities, a transatlantic tunnel, permanent space stations, and spandex jackets. Fagen remembered being enchanted by the prospects of a "gleaming future" and hoped to give an optimistic look back at it. The title of "Green Flower Street" is a "nod to the jazz standard On Green Dolphin Street." "Ruby Baby" is modeled after the Drifters' version of the song. For his rewrite of "Ruby Baby", he listened to several records from the 1950s to "get a general atmosphere of the period." "Maxine" references the harmonies of the Four Freshmen, and revolves around an "extremely idealized version of high-school romance." The music was created from an Ed Greene drum track rescued from another song, where it wasn't working.

"New Frontier" follows a "gawky teenager" inviting a girl back to his family's backyard fallout shelter for a private gathering. "The Nightfly", the title song, was once described by American novelist Arthur Phillips as a "portrait of a late-night D.J. in Baton Rouge, taking lunatic phone calls from listeners while silently battling his own loneliness and regret." According to Fagen, the song "uses a lot of images from the blues: that hair formula gets its name from Charley Patton, the old delta blues guitarist, and Mount Belzoni gets its name from another old blues lyric: 'When the trial's in Belzoni/No need to scream and cry.'" "The Goodbye Look" alludes to the popularity of bossa nova in the 1960s. The song is a "tale of military upheaval on a Caribbean island." The last song, "Walk Between Raindrops", has origins in a Jewish folk tale. It was the last song to be recorded, and took form "almost as an afterthought," according to writer Sweet.

Artwork 

The album's cover artwork features a photo of Donald Fagen as a disc jockey, wearing a collared shirt and tie, speaking into a RCA 77DX microphone. In front of him is a turntable (16 inch '50s model, with a Para-Flux A-16 tonearm), an ashtray, a matchbook, and a pack of Chesterfield King cigarettes. Visible on the table with the record player is the cover of the 1958 jazz album Sonny Rollins and the Contemporary Leaders (one of Fagen's favorite albums). On the wall behind is a large clock, indicating that the time is 4:09. An advertisement in Billboard shortly before the album's release described the album cover: "At 4:09 a.m., silence and darkness have taken hold of the city. The only sound is the voice of The Nightfly". Fagen appeared on the album cover despite his reclusive nature. "It was an autobiographical album so it seemed like I might as well go public with it," he said. The cover was shot in Fagen's apartment in the Upper East Side of Manhattan by photographer James Hamilton. Two shoots were arranged because in the first, the RCA microphone was facing the wrong direction. Gale Sasson and Vern Yenor are credited with the cover's set design.

In his memoir, Eminent Hipsters, Fagen notes that the cover figure "wasn't supposed to be a stand-in for any particular jazz DJ," but noted a few personalities from the period that factored into the creation: Ed Beach, Dan Morgenstern, Martin Williams, R.D. Harlan, "Symphony Sid" Torin, and what Fagen regarded as his "main man", WEVD's Mort Fega. "He was laid-back, knowledgeable, and forthright, the cool uncle you wished you'd had." At the time of the album's release, he remembered that jazz music offered him an escape from the adults in his life: "When I saw 'E.T.,' I realized that the E.T. in my bedroom was my Thelonious Monk records. Everything that he represented was totally unworldly in a way, although at the same time, jazz to me seemed more real than the environment in which I was living." The Wall Street Journal Robert J. Toth writes, "The cover adds another layer of autobiography. On the front, we see Mr. Fagen as a crew-cut deejay on the graveyard shift. On the back is his audience, a single lighted window in a row of tract homes — or maybe the artist as a young man, drinking in inspiration." Robert Palmer, of The New York Times, continued in this line of thinking: "Inside, there's a teenager with his ear next to a portable radio. He's playing it softly, so his parents won't wake up, and he can barely make out the sounds through the static. [...] The teenager was Donald Fagen."

Release 
The Nightfly was released on October 1, 1982, on vinyl and cassette. It was also released in its first prerecorded digital form, via half-inch Beta and VHS format cassettes issued by Mobile Fidelity Sound Lab. In addition, a matching folio for the album was released by Cherry Lane Music in February 1983. It was first widely available on compact disc in 1984; a reader's poll conducted by Digital Audio magazine the following year ranked it among the best releases of the time, alongside Security (1982) by Peter Gabriel (another fully digital recording) and Bruce Springsteen's Born in the U.S.A. (1984). Early CD copies, however, suffered from being manufactured from third and fourth generation masters. Nichols discovered this when he received a call from Stevie Wonder, who told him that his CD copy of The Nightfly sounded "funny." Nichols penned an essay in Recording Engineer and Producer, criticizing record companies' apparent carelessness in manufacturing the then-nascent format. The Nightfly was reissued on various disc formats four times in recent years, each time with a multichannel mix: on DVD-Audio in 2002, on DualDisc in 2004, on MVI in 2007 and on hybrid multichannel SACD in The Warner Premium Sound series by Warner Japan in 2011.

Following completion of the album, Fagen entered therapy and more-or-less dropped out of public sight. In his memoir, Eminent Hipsters, he writes that "the panic attacks I used to get as a kid returned, only now accompanied by morbid thoughts and paranoia, big-time." He remained paralyzed for much of the rest of the 1980s, "gobbling antidepressants" and nearly unable to get through each day. He came to view The Nightfly as the culmination of "whatever kind of energy was behind the writing I had been doing in the '70s." He turned down requests for television performances, opting only for radio and press interviews. Though he suggested he may do smaller concerts in New York, Fagen did not tour behind The Nightfly. He expounded upon his mental state after the album's completion:

In 2006, Fagen maintained that "I haven't listened to The Nightfly since I made it."

Since resuming as a touring band in 1993, Steely Dan has performed several songs from The Nightfly on occasion; Fagen also did as a solo artist during a 2006 tour in support of his third solo album, Morph the Cat. Most recently, Steely Dan — now with Fagen as the sole original member following Walter Becker's death in 2017 — performed The Nightfly in its entirety at the Beacon Theatre in New York City, and Orpheum Theater in Boston, Massachusetts, in 2019. An official live recording compiled from these performances, "Donald Fagen's The Nightfly Live," was released in 2021.

Critical reception 

The Nightfly was met with near universal acclaim. Billboard labeled it their top album pick in the first month of its release, calling it a "stunning debut" and praising its "typically blue chip crew of crack players and crisp digital production." David Fricke wrote in Rolling Stone that "Donald Fagen conjures a world where all things are possible, even to a kid locked in his bedroom." Robert Christgau, writing for The Village Voice, gave the album an A and commented, "these songs are among Fagen's finest [...] his acutely shaded lyrics put the jazziest music he's ever committed to vinyl into a context that like everything here is loving but very clear-eyed." Robert Palmer of The New York Times called it a "vivid and frequently ingenious look back at a world that is gone forever. Its sound is glossy and contemporary, but references to both the spirit and the music of the years when Mr. Fagen was growing up can be found in almost every song." Charles Shaar Murray of NME called The Nightfly "an album which doesn't so much dilute the arctic smartassery of the Dan as warm it up, loosen it up, and present it in a new context." The sole poor review came from Paul Strange at Melody Maker, who dubbed the album a "bummer. What made the Dan an important band of the early '70s has been replaced by ultra-slick, uninspired background mush."

Subsequent reviews have remained positive. Jon Matsumoto picked it for a "Classic of the Week" editorial in the Los Angeles Times in 1994, calling it an "elegant pop album," praising the album's "vivid lyrical tapestry" and "rhythmically effervescent" music. Jason Ankeny of AllMusic regarded The Nightfly as a continuation of "the smooth pop-jazz mode favored on the final Steely Dan records", as well as "lush and shimmering, produced with cinematic flair by Gary Katz; romanticized but never sentimental... crafted with impeccable style and sophistication." Bud Scoppa, in a review of the Nightfly trilogy (a reissue of Fagen's first three studio albums), wrote that they are "united not just by their sophistication but also by a sense of nostalgia for what has been irretrievably lost." The Nightfly is described as a "superb jazz-pop solo album" in Pete Prown and HP Newquist's 1997 book Legends of Rock Guitar. Jazz historian Ted Gioia cites it as an example of Steely Dan "proving that pop-rock could equally benefit from a healthy dose of jazz" during their original tenure, which coincided with a period when rock musicians frequently experimented with jazz idioms and techniques.

Accolades 
The Nightfly was nominated for seven awards at the 25th Annual Grammy Awards in 1983, including Album of the Year and Best Engineered Recording – Non-Classical. "I.G.Y." received the most nominations, included on lists for Song of the Year, Best Pop Vocal Performance, Male, and Best Instrumental Arrangement Accompanying Vocal(s), while "Ruby Baby" received a nod for Best Vocal Arrangement. In addition, Gary Katz was nominated for Producer of the Year. In 2000, it was voted number 288 in Colin Larkin's All Time Top 1000 Albums, and in 2006, it was included in Robert Dimery's 1001 Albums You Must Hear Before You Die. In 2010, Vatican City's L'Osservatore Romano selected The Nightfly as one of its official Top 10 Albums.

Commercial performance 
The Nightfly debuted on Billboard Rock Albums chart at number 39 during the week ending October 23, 1982, peaking at number 25 on November 13. It debuted on the magazine's all-genre Top LPs and Tape chart on October 30 at number 45; it climbed to number 11, its peak, on November 27. It also charted on Billboard Black LPs chart, peaking at number 24. Internationally, the album charted higher: in Norway, it reached number seven on the charts. In Sweden and New Zealand, the album peaked at numbers eight and nine, respectively. The Nightfly performed more poorly than Gaucho commercially; Fagen felt as though the label did not market the album properly or effectively. WBCN in Boston, inspired by the album cover, developed a promotion in which listeners could register to host their own radio show.

Legacy 
The album remains a favorite among audiophiles. According to Paul Tingen, from Sound on Sound magazine, The Nightfly was "for years a popular demonstration record in hi-fi stores across the globe." Paul White, editor-in-chief of Sound on Sound, said The Nightfly "is always a good reference for checking out monitoring systems and shows what good results could be obtained from those early digital recording systems in the right hands." In addition to its use in recording studio tests, Clive Young of Pro Sound News called Fagen's "I.G.Y." the "Free Bird" of pro audio, claiming that almost every live sound engineer uses the song to test the front-of-house system's sound response. EQ Magazine rated The Nightfly as among the Top 10 Best Recorded Albums of All Time, alongside the Beatles's Sgt. Pepper's Lonely Hearts Club Band and the Beach Boys' Pet Sounds.

Track listing

Bonus tracks, from The Nightfly Trilogy MVI Boxed Set 
"True Companion" – 5:09
"Green Flower Street (Live)" – 4:24
"Century's End" – 5:31

Personnel 
Adapted from the album's liner notes.

Side one
"I.G.Y."
Donald Fagen – lead vocals, synthesizers, synth blues harp
Dave Bargeron – trombone
Michael Brecker – tenor saxophone
Randy Brecker – trumpet
Ronnie Cuber – baritone saxophone
Rick Derringer – guitar 
Frank Floyd – background vocals
James Gadson – drums
Gordon Grody – background vocals
Anthony Jackson – bass 
Hugh McCracken – guitar 
Rob Mounsey – synthesizers
Greg Phillinganes – electric piano
Jeff Porcaro – additional drums
Zachary Sanders – background vocals
Valerie Simpson – background vocals 
David Tofani – alto saxophone 
Starz Vanderlocket – percussion
"Green Flower Street"
Donald Fagen – lead vocals, synthesizers 
Larry Carlton – lead guitar 
Frank Floyd – background vocals
Daniel Lazerus – background vocals
Rob Mounsey – synthesizers
Dean Parks – guitar 
Greg Phillinganes - electric piano, clavinet
Jeff Porcaro – drums
Chuck Rainey – bass
Zachary Sanders – background vocals
Valerie Simpson – background vocals 
Starz Vanderlocket – percussion
"Ruby Baby"
Donald Fagen – lead vocals, organ, synthesizers, electric piano, background vocals
Michael Brecker – tenor saxophone
Randy Brecker – trumpet, flugelhorn
Larry Carlton – lead guitar
Rick Derringer – guitar 
James Gadson – additional drums
Anthony Jackson – bass 
Hugh McCracken – guitar 
Michael Omartian – piano 
Greg Phillinganes – piano solo 
Jeff Porcaro – drums 
Valerie Simpson – background vocals 
"Maxine"
Donald Fagen – lead vocals, organ, electric piano, background vocals
Dave Bargeron – euphonium 
Michael Brecker – tenor saxophone 
Randy Brecker – flugelhorn
Larry Carlton – guitar
Ronnie Cuber – baritone saxophone
Ed Greene – drums
Marcus Miller – bass
Greg Phillinganes – piano
David Tofani – alto saxophone

Side two
"New Frontier"
Donald Fagen – lead vocals, synthesizers, background vocals
Larry Carlton – lead guitar
Ed Greene – drums
Abraham Laboriel – bass 
Hugh McCracken – harmonica
Michael Omartian – piano, electric piano
Starz Vanderlocket – percussion, background vocals
"The Nightfly"
Donald Fagen – lead vocals, synthesizers, piano, background vocals
Larry Carlton – lead guitar
Rick Derringer – guitar 
Frank Floyd – background vocals
Hugh McCracken – guitar	
Marcus Miller – bass 
Rob Mounsey – synthesizers 
Michael Omartian – electric piano
Jeff Porcaro – drums
Zachary Sanders – background vocals 
Valerie Simpson – background vocals 
"The Goodbye Look"
Donald Fagen – lead vocals, organ, synthesizers, background vocals
Larry Carlton – lead guitar
Steve Khan – acoustic guitar 
Marcus Miller – bass
Dean Parks – guitar
Greg Phillinganes – synthesizer, electric piano
Jeff Porcaro – drums
Valerie Simpson – background vocals
Starz Vanderlocket – percussion
"Walk Between Raindrops"
Donald Fagen – lead vocals, organ, synthesizers, electric piano, background vocals
Larry Carlton – guitar
Steve Jordan – drums
Will Lee – bass
Lesley Miller – background vocals
Greg Phillinganes – synthesizer bass

Donald Fagen – horn arrangements, liner notes
Rob Mounsey – horn arrangements

Production

Gary Katz – record producer
 Roger Nichols – percussion, special effects, engineer, sequencing
 Daniel Lazerus – background vocals (2), engineer, overdub engineer
Elliot Scheiner – engineer, mixing, tracking
Cheryl Smith – assistant engineer
Robin Lane – assistant engineer
Mike Morongell – assistant engineer, digital editing assistant
Wayne Yurgelun – assistant engineer, digital editing assistant
Bob Ludwig – mastering
Ginger Dettman – project assistant
Steve Pokorny – project assistant
Steve Woolard – project assistant
David Dieckmann – authoring
George Lydecker  – authoring
Greg Allen – design, art direction
George Delmerico – art direction
Cory Frye – editorial supervision
James Hamilton – photography
Andrew Thomas – screen design

Charts

Weekly charts

Year-end charts

Certifications

Notes

References

Sources

External links 

 Official YouTube playlist
 Complete lyrics

Donald Fagen albums
1982 debut albums
Concept albums
Albums produced by Gary Katz
Warner Records albums